Matt Muffelman (born November 22, 1980) is an American lightweight rower. He won a gold medal at the 2008 World Rowing Championships in Ottensheim with the lightweight men's eight.

References

1980 births
Living people
American male rowers
World Rowing Championships medalists for the United States